Maskareh may refer to:
 Maskareh, Kerman

See also
 Masgareh